Balasupramaniam Krishnan .PPN .PKPB .PJB. F.(Com) (more fondly known as Captain Bala or Capt.K.Bala) is a prominent safety activist, safety advocate, emergency survival trainer and Malaysian humanitarian.

He is the founder and chairman of Malaysia International Search and Rescue (MISAR) and Malaysian Volunteer Fire & Rescue Association (MVFRA). He is also the President of Road Safety Marshal Club (RSMC). He is the Director of Code Red Survival Academy.

He has 23 years of experience in the search and rescue arena. He has led his team of volunteer members to serve in various international search and rescue operations and also humanitarian aid, namely,  Bam Iran earthquake in 2003, Bandar Aceh earthquake and tsunami in 2004, Peru earthquake in 2007,  Sichuan earthquake in 2008, Cyclone Nargis Myanmar in 2008, Typhoon Ketsana Philippines in 2009, Thailand Floods Operation in 2011, Nepal earthquake in April 2015, and  Pidie Jaya, Aceh earthquake in 2016.

In June 2007, he rescued Ceriyati Dapin, an Indonesian maid who attempted to escape through the window of her employer's 18th floor apartment and unfortunately was stuck on a ledge on the 15th floor. He received an appreciation from the Indonesia Government for protecting the citizen of Indonesia in Malaysia by the ambassador of Indonesia, Mr A.M Fachir on 17 August 2007 at ambassador residence at Kuala Lumpur.

He was featured as one of the icon for Malaysia WiraNegaraku.

Malaysia International Search and Rescue (MISAR) 
MISAR Malaysia is a non-governmental and non-profit organization founded by Capt.K.Bala. It is a platform for individuals with the passion to serve in search and rescue missions and humanitarian field. MISAR Malaysia plays an  important role in the search and rescue arena locally and internationally.  MISAR Malaysia was at the forefront in rendering humanitarian aid to the victims in the  Pidie Jaya, Aceh earthquake in 2016.

Malaysian Volunteer Fire and Rescue Association (MVFRA) 
MVFRA is a non-governmental organization and non-profit organization established in 1991 by Capt.K.Bala. MVFRA has served the nation in, amongst other, the Bright Sparklers Fireworks disaster in 1991, Choon Hong III Port Klang Fire Tragedy in 1992, Highland Towers collapse in 1993, 2008 Bukit Antarabangsa landslide, Penan Food Aid Operation in 2009, Langkawi Bukit Malut Fire Victim Relief Operation in 2010,  Malaysia Floods Relief Operation from 2010–2016,  Sabah Earthquake Rescue Operation in 2015, Beaufort Flood Relief Operation in 2015, Ranau water shortage relief operation in 2015, Kg Landung Ayang Laut Kudat Fire Relief Operation in 2016.

Road Safety Marshal Club (RSMC) 
Road Safety Marshal Club (RSMC) is a non-governmental organization established in 2008 with the aim to provide support for the success of the activities of road safety and to conduct road safety awareness program for the public.

Recognition and awards 
 2016 - Awarded the Lifetime Achievement Award - A Prime Minister's Award-Volunteer Malaysia Awards 2016 
 2005 - Awarded the Pingat Pangkuan Negara (Honorary Title of PPN) conferred by DYMM Tunku Syed Sirajuddin Putra Jamalullail 
 2005 - Awarded the NST-PwC Young Humanitarian Award, presented by YAB Datuk Seri Najib Tun Razak 
 2004 - Awarded the Young Outstanding Malaysian Award, presented by YB Dato' Sri Ong Tee Keat
 2002 - Awarded the Young Outstanding Malaysian Award by Junior Chamber Mandarin Kuala Lumpur
 2002 - Awarded the highest award of Pingat Ketua Pengarah Bomba (Honorary Title of PKPB), presented by the former Director General Fire & Rescue Department YS Prof Dato Dr Soh Chai Hock
 1999 - Awarded the Anugerah Belia Negara by Ministry of Youth and Sports (Malaysia), presented by YAB Tun Dato' Seri Dr Mahathir bin Mohamad
 1999 - Awarded the Pingat Jasa Bomba (Honorary Title of PJB) by The Fire and Rescue Department of Malaysia, presented by the former Director General Fire & Rescue Department YS Prof Dato Dr Soh Chai Hock

He was awarded the "Fire Commander" Commanding Accreditation (F.Com) in Fire & Rescue Service by YS Prof Dato Dr Soh Chai Hock, President for Fire Prevention Council Malaysia Institute of Fire Engineers Malaysia.

Publications and presentations 
 2006 - Burden of Injuring South Africa World Health Conference 
 2012- Presented in TNB Safety Conference on REACT Crime Prevention & Survival Program
 2012- Road Safety Conference in Malaysia 
 2012- Clinical Health Conference by WHO 
 2012- MBA
 2013- International Women's Day 
 2011- NIOSH Safety Conference
 2011- Presented in TNB 5th Occupational Safety, Health & Environment Conference 2011 on Empowering SHOE towards Malaysian Number 1 Killer "Road Traffic Accident" with Road Survival Skills"

Featured  
 Capt.K.Bala to the rescue!, New Straits Times, 14 July 2019 
 Women, Beware, The Star, 2 January 2010 
 Staying Alive in the Face of Danger, The Star, 25 September 2010 
 Volunteer Firefighters Brave the Heat to Save Lives, The Star, 12 November 2012 
 震撼人心（三）：苏财福：勿依赖救援单位遇震先自救, China Press, 30 July 2015 
 震撼人心（四）从小灌输融入生活向日本学防, China Press, 31 July 2015 
 Crucial to be Alert and Prepared to Stay Safe, The Star, 24 June 2012 
 Don't Give Crime an Opportunity, The Edge, 22 May 2014 
 Disaster Preparedness: How ready are we to face the worst?, The Rocket, 7 January 2015 
Local Emergency Response Teams a Must at Waterfalls, FMT News, 23 August 2016 
 March 2017 - House Fires and Road Safety, Live and Learn Programme, BFM 
 March 2016 - Malaysian Drives Gone Wild, Live and Learn Programme, BFM  
 July 2014 - Amanita and Crime Prevention, Live and Learn Programme, BFM 
 December 2013 - Surviving Deadly Floods, Live and Learn Programme, BFM 
 January 2013 - Volunteering your Life for Others, Evening Edition, BFM 
 June 2012 - Civic-Mindedness and Your Safety, Live and Learn Programme, BFM 
 August 2011 - Safety during Raya, Live and Learn Programme, BFM 
 May 2011 - Child Safety: At Home & On the Road, Live and Learn Programme, BFM 
 December 2010 - Road Safety Measures, Live and Learn Programme, BFM 
 September 2010 - How to be Safe and Streetwise - Tips for Women, Live and Learn Programme, BFM 
 December 2009 - Road Safety this Holiday Season, Live and Learn Programme, BFM 
 July 2009 - Anticipating Road Accidents, Live and Learn Programme, BFM

References

Living people
Malaysian humanitarians
Medallists of the Order of the Defender of the Realm
Year of birth missing (living people)